Phlebodes is a genus of skippers in the family Hesperiidae, subfamily Hesperiinae.

Species
Recognised species in the genus Phlebodes include:
 Phlebodes campo (Bell, 1947) 
 Phlebodes fuldai (Bell, 1930)
 Phlebodes pertinax (Stoll, 1781)
 Phlebodes sameda (Herrich-Schäffer, 1869)

Former species
Phlebodes chittara Schaus, 1902 - transferred to Chitta chittara (Schaus, 1902)
Phlebodes pares Bell, 1959 - transferred to Pares pares (Bell, 1959)
Phlebodes simplex Bell, 1930 - transferred to Tigasis simplex (Bell, 1930)
Phlebodes storax Mabille, 1891 - transferred to Parphorus storax (Mabille, 1891)

References

Natural History Museum Lepidoptera genus database

Hesperiinae
Hesperiidae genera